Artigasia is a genus of nematodes belonging to the family Hystrignathidae. It was  described  from  the  gut  caeca  of Passalus  interstitialis from  Escaleras  de  Jaruco,  La Habana Province, and El Pan de Matanzas, Matanzas Province, both in Cuba.

Species:
Artigasia ensicrinata 
Artigasia milerai 
Artigasia monodelpha 
Artigasia pauliani

References

Nematodes